The Butchers (also known as Death Factory and The Factory) is a 2014 horror film directed by Steven Judd and written by David Dittlinger and Stephen Durham.

Plot 

While on a bus with his brother, Brian, and a dozen others, Simon has a nightmare about when he fatally clubbed his abusive father, who had killed their mother. In a nearby ghost town, the landowner meets JB, a lawyer who wants to buy the property, primarily for its museum dedicated to serial killers: Albert Fish, John Wayne Gacy, Jack the Ripper, Jeffrey Dahmer, Ed Gein, and the Zodiac, "The Death Factory". When the landowner refuses to sell the museum along with the rest of his property, JB stabs him, then prepares an occult ritual with a Book of the Dead, and blood samples taken from the displays in the Death Factory.

Elsewhere, the bus Simon is on breaks down, so he and the other passengers go in search of aid while the driver remains with the vehicle, which he disappears with after the group leaves. The passengers reach the ghost town, and while the others debate what to do, Star and Ren wander off, and uncover JB's belongings. For fun, the duo read from the Book of the Dead, unintentionally resurrecting Fish, Gacy, Dahmer, Gein, the Zodiac, and the Ripper, who is revealed to be  lesbian.

While JB fights to flee from Fish, Star is killed by Gein, and Ren is slain by the Zodiac. Simon is then attacked by Fish, whose neck he breaks, causing Fish to disintegrate into a dust that enters Simon's body. The other murderers, who begin succumbing to infighting, continue to run amok. Gacy stabs Bill, the Ripper dismembers Nicole, JB guts Candi, and Gein stabs Dahmer, and then is bludgeoned by JB.

Simon stabs Gacy and the Ripper, and absorbs their "power" like he did Fish's, Gein did Dahmer's, and JB did Gein's. Simon, Brian, and the remaining passengers, are then confronted by JB, who impales Simon, though his friends resurrect him with the Book of the Dead, giving Simon the chance to snap JB's neck. Simon is then overpowered by the Zodiac, who the others set on fire, and hit with the landowner's car, which they and Simon drive off in.

The bus driver, who is implied to be Satan, reappears, and revives JB, noting, "You think you can steal from me, and there won't be Hell to pay? Or should I say, repay? C'mon, son, you've got work to do."

Cast 
 Semi Anthony as JB
 Damien Puckler as Simon
 Randall Bosley as The Collector
 Cameron Bowen as Brian
 Braxton Davis as Bill
 Mara Hall as Auntie May
 Jacob Hobbs as Kip
 Tonya Kay as Star
 Christy Keller as Jan
 Charito Mertz as Candi
 Milly Sanders as Daisy
 Jeremy Thorsen as Ren
 Ire Wardlaw as Nicole
 Rick Williamson as Albert Fish
 Hawk Walts as John Wayne Gacy
 Mary LeGault as Ripper
 Marion Kopf as Jeffrey Dahmer
 Gary Kasper as Ed Gein
 John C. Epperson as The Zodiac

Reception 

Of the film, Rob Getz of Horror News wrote "No one will accuse Death Factory of greatness, but it would lose its charm if it were" and that it relies "far more on curiosity factor than upon consistency or execution". UK Horror Scene's Dave Wain gave the film a 0/10, and condemned it as "an abhorrent sleazy little movie that will only serve to repel and disgust anyone that's unfortunate to come across it".

References

External links 
 
 Interview with David Dittlinger at UK Horror Scene
 Interview with David Dittlinger at Battle Royale with Cheese

2014 films
2014 horror films
2010s exploitation films
American road movies
Films about magic
American slasher films
Cultural depictions of Ed Gein
Cultural depictions of John Wayne Gacy
Cultural depictions of the Zodiac Killer
American exploitation films
Films about lawyers
Films about orphans
Films about siblings
Films set in museums
Patricide in fiction
The Devil in film
Uxoricide in fiction
American supernatural horror films
Lesbian-related films
Films about mass murder
2014 LGBT-related films
Films shot in California
Bisexuality-related films
LGBT-related horror films
American independent films
American LGBT-related films
Cultural depictions of Jack the Ripper
Films about domestic violence
Abandoned buildings and structures in fiction
2014 independent films
2010s English-language films
2010s American films